is a trans-Neptunian object orbiting the Sun as a detached object in the outer reaches of the Solar System. The object was first observed on 21 May 2010 by astronomers Andrzej Udalski, Scott Sheppard, M. Szymanski and Chad Trujillo at the Las Campañas Observatory in Chile.

Description 

 orbits the Sun at a distance of 42.9–47.8 AU once every 305 years and 3 months (111,504 days), similar to Makemake, Chaos and other bodies that circle the Sun in 6:11 resonance to Neptune. Its orbit has an eccentricity of 0.05 and an inclination of 26° with respect to the ecliptic.

Using the best-fit values for its orbit, it is expected to come to perihelion in 2109. It has been observed 28 times over 3 oppositions and has an uncertainty parameter of 5. As of 2016, is 46.1 AU from the Sun. The body's spectral type as well as its rotation period remain unknown.

Brown assumes an albedo of 0.09 and magnitude of 4.5, resulting in an estimated diameter of 574 kilometers.

References

External links 
 Large New Trans-Neptunian Object  Discovered (BAA Blog : 9 June 2010)
 OCKS: OGLE Carnegie Kuiper belt Survey (OCKS is a Southern sky survey searching for Kuiper Belt objects and dwarf planets)
 
 

Minor planet object articles (unnumbered)

20100521